Compagnie des messageries aériennes was a pioneering French airline which was in operation from 1919–23, when it was merged with Grands Express Aériens to form Air Union.

History
Compagnie des messageries aériennes was established February 1919 by Louis Charles Breguet, Louis Blériot, Louis Renault and René Caudron. The first commercial route, a mail and freight service between Le Bourget Airport, Paris and Lille-Lesquin Airport, Lille, was started 18 April 1919 using ex-military Breguet 14s. In August, a service was started to Brussels. On 19 September, an international passenger service between Paris - Le Bourget Airport and London (Hounslow Heath Aerodrome) was started, also using Breguet 14s.

The company was merged with Grands Express Aériens to form Air Union on 1 January 1923.

Accidents and incidents
 On 23 June 1921, a Blériot-SPAD S.27, F-CMAY of CMA was en route from Croydon to Le Bourget. It encountered technical problems and attempted a forced landing, possibly aiming for Bekesbourne Aerodrome, Kent, but crashed onto an adjacent railway line, first hitting telegraph cables which would have softened the impact. The two passengers were unharmed, while the pilot received minor injuries having been pinned underneath the aircraft. The aircraft was written off.
On 3 June 1922, CMA's Blériot-SPAD S.33 F-ACMH en route from Croydon to Le Bourget crashed into the English Channel off Folkestone, killing both passengers and the pilot.
On 15 March 1923, Farman F.60 Goliath F-AEIE overran the runway on landing at Croydon and collided with a building. The aircraft was later repaired and returned to service.
On 3 December 1923, Goliath F-AEIF, which may have been operated by CMA, crashed at Littlestone, Kent.

Fleet

 Breguet 14 (2 passengers)
 Farman F.60 Goliath (12 passengers, 15 aircraft)
 Blériot-SPAD S.27 (2 passengers, 10 aircraft)
 Blériot-SPAD S.33 (5 passengers, 15 aircraft)

Notes

References
Bluffield, Robert. 2009. Imperial Airways - The Birth of the British Airline Industry 1914–1940. Ian Allan  
Sherwood, Tim. 1999. Coming in to Land: A Short History of Hounslow, Hanworth and Heston Aerodromes 1911–1946. Heritage Publications (Hounslow Library)

External links
Le développement du transport aérien en Europe (1919-1932)
Timetable images

Airlines established in 1919
Defunct airlines of France
Airlines disestablished in 1923
French companies established in 1919
1923 disestablishments in France